Jeremy M. Johnson (born July 19, 1982 in Concord, North Carolina) is a professional baseball pitcher. Johnson previously spent ten years in the minor league organizations of the Detroit Tigers and Houston Astros.

Johnson graduated from Mooresville High School in Mooresville, North Carolina in 2000. As a high school baseball player he was named an honorable mention on the 2000 USA Today All-USA high school baseball team. Johnson entered the amateur draft and was selected by the Detroit Tigers in the 11th round. Johnson reported to the Rookie-level Gulf Coast Tigers, where he went 3-1 with an ERA of 4.15. Toward the end of the season, the Tigers promoted Johnson to the Single-A Oneonta Tigers in the New York–Penn League, where he went 0-1 with a 2.89 ERA.

Johnson opened the  season with Oneonta, where he went 7-1 in twelve starts with a 3.42 ERA before being promoted to the Single-A West Michigan Whitecaps in late August. Johnson finished out the Whitecaps season, going 1-1; he also played a few games for the Single-A Lakeland Flying Tigers. Johnson returned to the Whitecaps for the  season, and posted a 4.26 ERA before being promoted (again) to Lakeland and then, later in the season, the Double-A Erie SeaWolves. At Erie, Johnson went 6-1 with a 3.88 ERA; opening there in the  season he was off to a strong start before being sidelined by a shoulder injury.

Johnson spent a shortened  season back at Lakeland, where he went 3-6 with an ERA of 4.67. His highlight performance occurred on July 30, when he threw six shutout innings in a 9-1 victory over the St. Lucie Mets. In , he finally reached the Triple-A Toledo Mud Hens, going 3-3 with an ERA of 3.44 in 39 appearances; for the first time mostly in a relief role. He became a free agent at the end of the  season and signed a minor league contract with the Houston Astros.

Johnson spent the first half of the  season with the Triple-A Round Rock Express, where he was 5-8 with a 3.51 ERA. Johnson both started (13 starts) and worked out of the bullpen (8 appearances). He signed with LG Twins in South Korea on July 21, 2009.

Jeremy Johnson is currently signed with the Houston Astros AA affiliate Corpus Christy Hooks as part of the starting pitcher rotation for the 2010 season.

References

External links

Career statistics and player information from Korea Baseball Organization

1982 births
Living people
Erie SeaWolves players
Gulf Coast Tigers players
LG Twins players
Oneonta Tigers players
People from Concord, North Carolina
Round Rock Express players
Toledo Mud Hens players
KBO League pitchers
American expatriate baseball players in South Korea
Minor league baseball players